The Philippine Sports Commission (PSC)  is an agency of the Philippine government which tackles matters concerning sports in the country. The sports agency is independent from the Philippine Olympic Committee which enjoys autonomy from the government.

History

The Philippine Sports Commission was created on January 24, 1990, through Republic Act No. 6847 or "The Philippine Sports Commission Act" during the administration of then-President Corazon Aquino.

Relations

Philippine Olympic Committee
The Philippine Sports Commission Act recognizes the role of the Philippine Olympic Committee as the national Olympic body for the International Olympic Committee. It also recognizes the autonomy of the Philippine Olympic Committee and likewise states that all National Sports Associations shall be Autonomous as well.

The Act designates the Philippine Olympic Committee as primarily responsible for activities related to the country's participation in the Olympic Games (International Olympic Committee), Asian Games (Olympic Council of Asia), Southeast Asian Games (Southeast Asian Games Federation), and other international athletic competitions.

Others
The Philippine Sports Commission has a partnership with the United States Sports Academy (USSA) through a Protocol of Cooperation signed in 2017. In May 2018, the PSC entered into a partnership with the USSA where the later will provide masters and doctorate degree certifications to Filipino sports officials. The Philippine government and the USSA had a similar program in the early 1980s during the administration of then-President Ferdinand Marcos.

The PSC has also relations with bodies from other countries such as Australia, Cuba, China, South Korea, Russia, and Spain to help the PSC develop sports in the country.

Leadership

Chairpersons

Composition 
Chairman: Richard "Dickie" Bachmann

Commissioners:
 Olivia "Bong" Coo
 Edward Hayco
 Walter Torres

Term ends on June 30, 2028.

See also
Philippine Olympic Committee
Philippine Sports Institute
Philippine Sports Training Center
Philippine Sports Hall of Fame
Philippines at the Olympics
Project Gintong Alay
Siklab Atleta
Incentives for medalists in the Philippines

References

External links

Philippine Sports Commission website

Sports organizations of the Philippines
Government agencies under the Office of the President of the Philippines
Government agencies established in 1990
 
Government sports agencies